Zumbrota may refer to:

Places

United States 
Zumbrota, Minnesota, a city
Zumbrota Covered Bridge, Minnesota's last remaining covered bridge
Zumbrota Township, Goodhue County, Minnesota

Ships 
USS Zumbrota (YP-93), a patrol craft that served in the United States Navy from 1917 to 1923